Henry McNamara (23 January 1884 – 7 November 1935) was an  Australian rules footballer who played with St Kilda in the Victorian Football League (VFL).

Notes

External links 

1884 births
1935 deaths
Australian rules footballers from Victoria (Australia)
St Kilda Football Club players